Eremiconus is a  subgenus  of sea snails, marine gastropod mollusks in the genus Conus,  family Conidae, the cone snails and their allies.

In the latest classification of the family Conidae by Puillandre N., Duda T.F., Meyer C., Olivera B.M. & Bouchet P. (2015), Eremiconus has become a subgenus of Conus as Conus (Eremiconus) represented as Conus Linnaeus, 1758

Distinguishing characteristics
The Tucker & Tenorio 2009 taxonomy distinguishes Eremiconus from Conus in the following ways:

 Genus Conus sensu stricto Linnaeus, 1758
 Shell characters (living and fossil species)
The basic shell shape is conical to elongated conical, has a deep anal notch on the shoulder, a smooth periostracum and a small operculum. The shoulder of the shell is usually nodulose and the protoconch is usually multispiral. Markings often include the presence of tents except for black or white color variants, with the absence of spiral lines of minute tents and textile bars.
Radular tooth (not known for fossil species)
The radula has an elongated anterior section with serrations and a large exposed terminating cusp, a non-obvious waist, blade is either small or absent and has a short barb, and lacks a basal spur.
Geographical distribution
These species are found in the Indo-Pacific region.
Feeding habits
These species eat other gastropods including cones.

 Subgenus Eremiconus Tucker & Tenorio, 2009
Shell characters (living and fossil species)
The shell is turbinate with a convex and scalariform spire.  The protoconch is paucispiral with 1.5 whorls.  The whorl tops have cords, but nodules are absent.  Ridges or sulci reach the shoulder.  The anal notch is shallow. The periostracum and operculum were not observed.
Radular tooth (not known for fossil species)
The radular tooth was no observed, and therefore its structure is unknown.
Geographical distribution
The only living species in this genus is endemic to Australia.
Feeding habits
Unknown.

Species list
This list of species is based on the information in the World Register of Marine Species (WoRMS) list. Species within the genus Eremiconus include:
 Eremiconus albellus Röckel & Korn, 1990 : synonym of Conus (Eremiconus) albellus Röckel & Korn, 1990, represented as Conus albellus Röckel & Korn, 1990  
 Eremiconus colmani Röckel & Korn, 1990 : synonym of Conus (Eremiconus) colmani Röckel & Korn, 1990 , represented as Conus colmani Röckel & Korn, 1990 
 Eremiconus limpusi Röckel & Korn, 1990: synonym of Conus (Eremiconus) limpusi Röckel & Korn, 1990, represented as Conus limpusi Röckel & Korn, 1990
 Eremiconus lizardensis Crosse, 1865 : synonym of Conus (Eremiconus) lizardensis Crosse, 1865, represented as Conus lizardensis Crosse, 1865 
 Eremiconus minnamurra (Garrard, 1961): synonym of Conus (Eremiconus) minnamurra (Garrard, 1961), represented as Conus minnamurra (Garrard, 1961)

References

Further reading 
 Kohn A. A. (1992). Chronological Taxonomy of Conus, 1758-1840. Smithsonian Institution Press, Washington and London.
 Monteiro A. (ed.) (2007). The Cone Collector 1: 1-28.
 Berschauer D. (2010). Technology and the Fall of the Mono-Generic Family The Cone Collector 15: pp. 51-54
 Puillandre N., Meyer C.P., Bouchet P., and Olivera B.M. (2011), Genetic divergence and geographical variation in the deep-water Conus orbignyi complex (Mollusca: Conoidea), Zoologica Scripta 40(4) 350-363.

External links
 To World Register of Marine Species
  Gastropods.com: Conidae setting forth the genera recognized therein.
 Gastropods.com: Image of Eremiconus minnamurra (Garrard, 1961).

Conidae
Gastropod subgenera